Out In The Light is the debut studio album by the American indie rock band WATERS, released in 2011 on TBD Recordings.

Critical reception
Drowned in Sound wrote that Pierszalowski's "heart is worn clearly on his sleeve without becoming too overbearing and the final product is nothing short of profound."

Track listing

Personnel
Van Pierszalowski – lead vocals, guitar
Nikolai Haukeland - guitar, bass
Sigmund Nilsen – drums
Marte Solbakken – keys, vocals

References

External links
WATERS – TBD RECORDS on the TBD Records website
 on the City Slang Records website

2011 debut albums
Waters (band) albums
TBD Records albums
Albums produced by John Congleton